

CD information
Format: Compact Disc (64903530972)
Stereo: Stereo
Pieces in Set: 1
Catalog #: 3097
Desc: Performer

Track listing
 Gideon War
 It's Not Easy
 De Ole Ah Wee
 Divide And Rule
 Visions
 Serious Time
 Israel God
 What You Gonna Do
 Come Into My World
 God & King (Refix)
 Brother David
 Worthly To Be Praise
 Until

2003 albums
Luciano (singer) albums